Mary Jane's Pa is a 1935 American drama film directed by William Keighley and written by Tom Reed and Peter Milne. The film stars Aline MacMahon, Guy Kibbee, Tom Brown, Robert McWade, Minor Watson, and Nan Grey. The film was released by Warner Bros. on April 27, 1935.

Plot

Cast     
 Aline MacMahon as Ellen Preston
 Guy Kibbee as Sam Preston
 Tom Brown as King Wagner
 Robert McWade as John Wagner
 Minor Watson as Kenneth Marvin
 Nan Grey as Lucille Preston
 John Arledge as Linc Overman 
 Robert Light as Fred
 Betty Jean Hainey as Mary Jane Preston
 Oscar Apfel as Chief Bailey
 DeWitt Jennings as Sheriff
 Carl Stockdale as Gene
 Louis Mason as Jones
 Jack Kennedy as Watchman

References

External links 
 
 
 
 

1935 films
1930s English-language films
Warner Bros. films
American drama films
1935 drama films
Films directed by William Keighley
Films scored by Heinz Roemheld
American black-and-white films
1930s American films
English-language drama films